The Bad Cache Rapids Group is a geologic Group in Ontario. It preserves fossils dating back to the Ordovician period.

See also

 List of fossiliferous stratigraphic units in Ontario

References
 

Ordovician Ontario